Fredrik Ask (born 5 September 1990) is a former Norwegian tennis player.

Ask played college tennis at the University of Arizona.

Ask has a career high ATP singles ranking of 1251 achieved on 18 October 2010 and his career high ATP doubles ranking of 800 was achieved on 23 October 2017.

Ask represented Norway at the Davis Cup where he has a W/L record of 1–3.

Career Finals

Doubles (1-1)

References

External links

1990 births
Living people
Norwegian male tennis players
Sportspeople from Oslo
Arizona Wildcats men's tennis players
Norwegian expatriates in the United States
21st-century Norwegian people